Dalip Singh Saund (September 20, 1899 – April 22, 1973) was an Indian-American politician who served in the United States House of Representatives from California's 29th congressional district as a member of the Democratic Party. He was the first Sikh, Indian American, and Asian American elected to the United States Congress. Prior to his tenure in Congress he was active in local politics in Imperial County, California.

Early life

Dalip Singh Saund was born in Chhajulwadi, British India, on September 20, 1899, to Natha Singh and Jeoni Kaur. His father died when he was ten years old. He attended Prince of Wales College. Saund supported the Indian independence movement while studying at the University of the Punjab. In 1919, he graduated with a bachelor of science in mathematics from the University of Punjab.

In 1920, Saund immigrated to the United States using money from his brother to study food preservation at the University of California, Berkeley and arrived on September 27. He did not return to India until 1957. He graduated with a master of arts in 1922, and Ph.D. in 1924. He married Marian Z. Kosa, with whom he had three children, on July 21, 1928.

Saund became a farmer in the Imperial Valley in 1925. His book My Mother India, a response to Katherine Mayo's Mother India, was published by Stockton, California's Sikh temple in 1930. He organized the Indian Association of America and served as its first president in 1942. He and the organization lobbied for legislation to allow Indians to be eligible for naturalization. The Luce–Celler Act was passed in 1946, and Saund gained American citizenship on December 16, 1949.

Career

Early politics
Saund supported Franklin D. Roosevelt during the 1932 presidential election. He worked for Glen Killingsworth, the Justice of the Peace of Westmoreland. Saund was elected to the Imperial County Democratic Central Committee without opposition in 1950, with the aid of Killingsworth, who died shortly afterwards. He was later elected as head of the committee in 1954. He served as a delegate to the 1952, 1956, and 1960 Democratic National Conventions.

Saund ran for Justice of the Peace in the 1950 election, but was not allowed to take the position as he had not been a citizen for long enough. In 1951, Saund attempted to be appointed by the Imperial County Board of Supervisors, but they selected Frank Lyall instead. Saund defeated Lyall in the 1952 election to become Justice of the Peace of Westmoreland. He claimed to be the only native Indian holding office in the United States at the time.

United States House of Representatives

Elections

During the 1956 election Saund ran to replace John R. Phillips, who was retiring, as the United States representative from California's 29th congressional district. On April 16, a legal challenge was filed against Saund claiming that he had not been a United States citizen long enough to run in the election, but the challenge was dismissed by the 4th California Courts of Appeal. He won the Democratic nomination and later defeated Republican nominee Jacqueline Cochran in the general election despite Dwight D. Eisenhower winning the area in the presidential election. He became the first and only Sikh elected to the United States Congress as well as the first Indian and Asian American elected to Congress.

Saund defeated John Babbage, a former member of the California State Legislature, in the 1958 election and Charles H. Jameson in the 1960 election. He won renomination against Rya E. Hiller during the 1962 election, despite being hospitalized for a stroke he had on May 1, but was defeated by Republican nominee Patrick M. Martin after being hospitalized at the National Naval Medical Center for the entire campaign.

Tenure
Following his election to the United States House of Representatives, Saund stated that he wanted a seat on the House Interior Committee to make sure that his district received a fair share of the Colorado River's water. In 1957, he was appointed to serve on a sub-committee in the United States House Committee on Foreign Affairs.

Saund stated during the 1956 election that he would travel to Asia if elected. He conducted a tour of multiple eastern Asian countries which included visits to Japan, Taiwan, British Hong Kong, Philippines, South Vietnam, Indonesia, Thailand, Burma, India, and Pakistan in 1957. He also visited Israel, where he met with Prime Minister David Ben-Gurion, on his way returning to the United States. In Indonesia he met with President Sukarno and in India he met with Prime Minister Jawaharlal Nehru.

Death
Saund was moved to UC San Diego Health in 1963. He died on April 22, 1973, after suffering a second stroke in Hollywood, California. Twenty-four members of the United States House of Representatives paid tribute to Saund on the House floor and a memorial service was held.

Political positions
In 1957, Saund criticized the United States for its policy of "buying kings and protecting oil" in the Middle East while ignoring the people. He stated that the British had done a similar policy in India and were "tossed out of India". He stated that the same thing would happen to the United States if it continued the policy. He praised President Dwight D. Eisenhower for his stand against the United Kingdom, France, and Israel during the Suez Crisis. He criticized the United States Department of State for giving a more elaborate welcome to Queen Elizabeth II than any Asian leader. He defended the United States during the Little Rock Crisis while on tour in Japan stating that "thirty-five out of the forty-eight states of the Union there was no discrimination against Negroes in schools or public places".

Electoral history

See also
List of Asian Pacific Americans in the United States Congress
List of Asian American jurists

References

Works cited

External links
 Dalip Singh Saund materials in the South Asian American Digital Archive (SAADA)
 
 The Dalip Singh Saund web site from the family archives

1899 births
1973 deaths
20th-century American politicians
American politicians of Indian descent
American people of Punjabi descent
American Sikhs
Burials at Forest Lawn Memorial Park (Glendale)
California politicians of Indian descent
Indian-American history
Indian emigrants to the United States
Members of the United States Congress of Indian descent
Democratic Party members of the United States House of Representatives from California
Asian-American members of the United States House of Representatives
Naturalized citizens of the United States
People from Imperial County, California
Punjabi people
University of California, Berkeley alumni
University of the Punjab alumni
20th-century Indian mathematicians
American justices of the peace
Ramgarhia people